The Wipptal Broncos are an ice hockey team, founded in 1948, in Sterzing in South Tyrol, northern Italy, playing in the Alps Hockey League and formerly the Serie A. 

Coached by Christopher Oly Hicks, they played the 2011–12 season in the Serie A, the highest level of ice hockey in Italy, before being relegated back to the Serie A2 for the 2012–13 season.

Achievements
Serie A runners-up: 1998
Serie A2 champions: 2005, 2009, 2011

See also
:Category:Wipptal Broncos players

References

External links
 Official website

Ice hockey teams in Italy
Ice hockey clubs established in 1948
1948 establishments in Italy
Serie A (ice hockey)
Alpenliga teams
Sport in South Tyrol